Física o Química is a Spanish drama television series produced by Ida y Vuelta Producciones for Antena 3 that was originally broadcast from 4 February 2008 to 13 June 2011. In this series they talked about topics such as: drug abuse, suicide, racism, domestic violence, rape, sex, virginity, pregnancy, homosexuality, anorexia nervosa, bulimia nervosa, cheating, forced marriage, same-sex marriage, adoption, cancer, lack of self-confidence, death, homophobia, xenophobia, prostitution, unprotected sex and forbidden love.

A reunion miniseries titled Física o Química: El reencuentro premiered on 27 December 2020 on Atresplayer Premium.

Synopsis 
A group of novice teachers begin to teach at an institute, the Zurbarán. Students seek their place in the world. Who said that teaching was easy? The series revolves around the world of teaching. The novelty is given by the point of view: the viewer sees through the eyes of some novice teachers, young individuals, newcomers to a secondary school and their fears, doubts and fears before their new work as educators. The arrival of these teachers will reveal to us a whole universe of conflicts, loves, heartbreaks, illusions and hopes of a group of boys and girls and the people around them.

Cast

Students 
 Yolanda "Yoli" Freire Caballar (Andrea Duro) Better known as the "Zorra Poligonera" due to her debauched demeanor. She is proud of the neighborhood where she is from and she likes sex. Her first love is Isaac, but the relationship is not consolidated. After his death, she goes out with Quino, Julio and Román. She is the victim of two rapes, the first by a classmate, Oliver, and later by Julio's father who scams her by saying that if she has sex with him, he will erase her brother Berto's police record. Yoli's best friends are Cova, Paula, Ruth and Fer, with whom she has a very close friendship and had a relationship with, and she almost got pregnant with Fer. Her strong friendship with Ruth makes her forgive her for her cheating with Román. She starts a relationship with Salva. (seasons 1–7)
 Fernando "Fer" Redondo Ruano (Javier Calvo) At the beginning of the series, he was Rubén's best friend, Julio's brother. He is the best friend of Cova, Julio and Yoli. He is homosexual and at first, he was in love with Rubén and after Julio without being reciprocated. His first boyfriend is named Hugo, although the relationship will be brief for betraying his trust. But then he meets the great love of his life, David, with whom he will form a partnership for the story. At first, they see each other secretly but then their relationship becomes public. Sometime later they separate because of David's deceptions and Fer's jealousy and distrust. Then begins to go out with Borja, with whom he is about to marry but David interrupts the wedding and reconciles with Fer, who had never stopped loving him. They are going to live together but have another crisis due to some misunderstandings between them. Fer realizes that his jealousy only manages to ruin their relationship and regrets his behavior. He dies due to an accident with a shotgun. (seasons 1–7)
 Paula Blasco Prieto (Angy Fernández) She is the sister of Isaac and the best friend of Cova and Yoli. At the beginning of the series she likes Cabano, but her first boyfriend will be Jan, until he cheats on her and they break up. Afterwards, she is with Cabano for a while but the relationship does not end well, especially when Alma gets in the way and the three of them have a threesome. After the summer, she wants to go back to Cabano, but the fact of not getting it makes her console herself with Gorka and have sex with him and she becomes pregnant with Gorka. She decides to have the child, she does not want Gorka to take over the responsibilities and unexpectedly ends up falling in love with Gorka. When the child, Isaac, is born, Gorka leaves, but eventually returns and they leave together. She began to audition to be a singer and went on tour. (seasons 1–7)
 Ruth Gómez Quintana (Úrsula Corberó) She loses her parents in a car accident and Clara becomes her legal guardian. She has self-esteem issues. She was Isaac's girlfriend, but he left her for Irene. Later she is Gorka's girlfriend. Despite being very hung up with him, she feels that the relationship does not suit her. For a time she is with Cabano, but ends up returning with Gorka. Then she has bulimia problems that mean that she is admitted to a center all summer. After the summer she goes back to Cabano and helps him when he has cancer. Román's arrival creates a rapprochement, and he leaves Cabano when he leaves. For a while she and Román go out together until she goes to study design in Barcelona. In the last episode she sends a video to everyone, where she appears with Cabano in Barcelona. (seasons 1–7)
 Julio de la Torre Reig (Gonzalo Ramos) In the first episode his brother, Rubén, commits suicide and he wants to investigate what happened. Their father abandoned them when they were little and their mother lives in England, therefore he is always alone. He falls in love with Cova, his ex-sister-in-law and they have a relationship, he lost his virginity with Cova and after having sex without a condom, Cova discovers that she is pregnant and hides it from Julio, later they discover that she was not really pregnant and both suffer a Pregnancy scare, they end their relationship because of their insecurities. He becomes a friend of a Nazi and starts dating Lucía, his sister. He goes through a very troublesome time that even causes him to be expelled from the institute. He leaves the gang of neo-Nazis when they want to beat up Fer and he defends him. Later he will go out with Violeta. He will have a relationship with Yoli, until his father reappears and intervenes. He had an interest in Teresa until he discovers the plot with Álvaro. The return of Cova to Zurbarán leads him to resume his relationship with Cova since he was always in love with Cova. Julio tells Cova that he has to go with his mother to England in a month. Julio and Cova have sex at Paula's house while they both take care of Isaac, Gorka and Paula's son. Cova and Julio have sex at Paula's house while they both take care of Isaac, Gorka and Paula's son. Cova takes Julio to the park where they had sex for the first time together, when Julio and Cova are talking in the park, Julio tells Cova that what happened at Paula's house was not a mistake, his only mistake was letting her go, and Julio tells Cova that if she had been pregnant he would not have cared, because he knows that they would have been great parents. Before going with Cova to Alicante, David tells Julio that Cova has a boyfriend in Alicante, Cova tells Julio that she left her boyfriend after having sex with him. Julio goes to live with Cova in Alicante. (seasons 1–7)
 Covadonga "Cova" Ariste Espinel (Leonor Martín) She is the class delegate, she is very ecologist, hippie, bohemian and very mature for her age, is what differentiates her from the rest, being in many cases a leader for the rest of her peers. She is always defending lost causes. Her best friends are Paula, Yoli, Fer, Ruth and Julio. She was Rubén's girlfriend. She falls in love with Julio, her ex-brother-in-law and they have a relationship, with whom she has sex and after having sex without a condom, Cova discovers that she is pregnant and hides it from Julio, later they discover that she was not really pregnant and both suffer a Pregnancy scare, they end their relationship because of their insecurities. When Julio breaks up with her, she is increasingly concerned about Julio's Nazi companies. She moves to live in Alicante with her parents, because her father was given a job there. She returns for the birth of Isaac, the son of Gorka and Paula. When Gorka flees, he stays at Cova's house. The return of Cova to Zurbarán leads her to resume her relationship with Julio. Cova and Julio have sex at Paula's house while they both take care of Isaac, Gorka and Paula's son. Cova takes Julio to the park where they had sex for the first time together, when Julio and Cova are talking in the park, Julio tells Cova that what happened at Paula's house was not a mistake, his only mistake was letting her go, and Julio tells Cova that if she had been pregnant he would not have cared, because he knows that they would have been great parents. Cova had a boyfriend in Alicante, Cova left her boyfriend after having sex with Julio and after realizing that she still loves Julio. When she goes back to Alicante, Julio goes with her. (seasons 1–3; 5–7)
 Gorka Martínez Mora (Adam Jezierski) He is a very conflictive student, who is always in trouble and annoying his classmates. He gets to make very practical jokes to Jan and Fer. He goes out with Ruth, but he humbles her in such a way that they always end up leaving the relationship. His best friend is Cabano, but he fights with him when he finds out that he is dating Ruth, whom he calls "Mi rubia". He is about to change and stop being such a bad person when he discovers that he has got Paula pregnant. He decides to take care of the child and ends up falling in love with her. He has problems with the law for beating up a boy who ran over Paula and who almost lost the child. When he is accused of having drugged Teresa at a party, he decides to temporarily disappear to avoid jail. He returns when all this problem has been solved and for the birth of his son Isaac. Problems as a parent make him leave again. When he meets Paula again, he confesses that he left because Dolores, Paula's mother, was making his life impossible and they end up reconciling. (seasons 1–7)
 César Cabano de Vera (Maxi Iglesias) He is the "handsome" boy from high school who is followed by many girls, like Paula, at the beginning of the series he liked Paula but as she starts dating Jan he begins to fall in love with Ruth. He has many problems at home because his father mistreats his mother. When his father abandons them, he has to look for work, coming to work on sex pages on the internet. His best friend is Gorka, but they get into a fight when he starts dating Ruth. They break up when she tells him that she is still in love with Gorka. He begins dating Paula, but mostly because he feels guilty about Isaac's death. Alma tries to "help" her with her relationship with Paula, but after having a threesome she makes everything end badly. After the summer, go back to Ruth. Shortly after, he discovers that he has testicular cancer, but manages to overcome this disease. He goes to India for a few months and comes back to see life differently. He says he wants to dedicate himself to football. They end up signing him for a team from England. He ends his relationship with Ruth. In the last episode Ruth sends a video to everyone, where she appears with Cabano in Barcelona. (seasons 1–5; 7)
 Isaac Blasco Prieto (Karim El-Kerem) He is Paula's brother. He falls in love with Irene and has a relationship before she is his teacher. When he sees her teaching classes, their relationship will continue in secret. For a while he is with Yoli, but he leaves her because he still likes Irene. It will be discovered, but he blames himself for being readmitted to the center. He is about to resume his relationship with her. Isaac dies in a quad accident, preventing Cabano from crashing into him. (seasons 1–2)
 Alma Núñez Fontevilla (Sandra Blázquez) She comes to the center hiding something serious from her past. Even Ruth discovers that her academic record has been empty for the past eight years. She tries to invent a thousand stories, until the truth is discovered: she has been in a reformatory for having participated in the death of a girl. She gets in the way of Paula and Cabano, she even has a threesome with them. Later she will fixate on Roque so that he can paint her naked, make her leave work and sleep with him and then despise him. Then she befriends Quino and by teaching him skills with the girls she is attracted to him, but the boy leaves the institute. For a time the gang doesn't talk to her, and she befriends Teresa. She falls in love with Álvaro but leaves him when she finds out what he did to Teresa. However, she continues to see him secretly while he goes out with Teresa. When everything is discovered, a great feud with Teresa begins. He repeats year after year to raise his grades and go to study in the United States. She prostitutes herself in order to get the money she needs for the scholarship. Álvaro does everything possible to make Alma stop prostitution. Alma is approved for the scholarship after obtaining the necessary bond to go to the United States, but decides to stay to take care of Álvaro after being hospitalized for steroid abuse. (seasons 3–7)
 David Ferrán Quintanilla (Adrián Rodríguez) He is Julio's best friend from childhood. Through Julio he meets Fer and begins to feel attracted to him. At first he tries to suppress his desires for fear of accepting himself as gay but then he realizes that he has really fallen in love with Fer. Finally he decides to come out of the closet in front of his friends and his parents, which will cost him a lot. Their relationship goes through bad times when he starts chatting with a stranger who doesn't stop harassing him and later they break up due to Fer's distrust. For a while she likes Jorge, but she doesn't get to have anything serious with him. He suffers a crisis when Fer is about to marry Borja and tries to commit suicide but Jorge stops him and makes him reconsider. Finally he appears at Fer and Borja's wedding and tells Fer everything he feels for him, both reconciling with a kiss in the rain. They move in together and go through another separation when he meets Susana again, an ex-girlfriend he dreams of at night. Finally he finds the explanation to these dreams and admits to Fer that he is bisexual. After going through several crises, he gives up and decides to leave Fer since his constant attacks of jealousy and doubts damage the relationship. (seasons 3–7)
 Rashid "Román" Lorente Arco (Nasser Saleh) His real name is Rashid and he is welcomed into Clara's house. His mother has been in jail and deals in drugs because he needs money for his grandfather, who is taking care of his little brothers. When everything is discovered, his brothers are transferred to a reception center. At first, he does not have a very good relationship with Ruth, but he will fall in love with her. Later he starts dating Yoli, but he cheats on her with Ruth. His relationship with Ruth ends when Clara leaves for Argentina and Ruth for Barcelona. Shares a flat with Fer and David. During the summer he has an approach with Teresa in the chat, when the course begins, she ignores him, but she will help him with the problems he has and between them something more than friendship will emerge between them. He starts a relationship with Teresa. (seasons 5–7)
 Salvador "Salva" Quintanilla (Álex Martínez) Salva is a serious boy, who interacts little with the rest and loves to write poems, this makes it completely different from the rest of its peers and that it stands out for it. At certain times he is the victim of ridicule for his way of being. He is a very shy and simple boy, which makes everyone think that he is homosexual, but he really is in love with Daniela, in order to be her best friend, he does not deny the rumor, when everything is discovered, he loses his friendship with Daniela and Jon. Daniela decides for him, but after Jon's accident, regrets cause them to end up leaving him. For a time he is the victim of practical jokes from Jon and Álvaro for spying on the girls in the locker room, including Daniela and Yoli. He overcomes these bad moments by making friends with Yoli and Fer, who will help him. He manages to forget Daniela and he likes Yoli more and more. He starts a relationship with Yoli. (seasons 6–7)
 Antonio "Toño" Aramillo (Víctor Palmero) He's a guy who wanted to be just as cool as his friends but they wouldn't let him. Out of his mind, feeling like a nobody and in a panic Toño loses his papers and does not hesitate to take a shotgun from his father in order to scare and teach Jon and Álvaro a lesson, who were making his life impossible. But unfortunately everything gets complicated and he ends up killing Fer by accident. The police detain him but it is not known what happens to him later, surely being a minor he was locked up in a juvenile prison or a psychiatric hospital. (season 7)
 Teresa Parra Lebrón (Lucía Ramos) She has grown overprotected by her father, thinking that her mother died. She discovers that his mother is Verónica shortly after she arrives at Zurbarán. She goes out very little with her friends, until Álvaro invites her to a party he's having. At this party they drug her and she ends up having sex with Julio, who had also been drugged without knowing it. With the help of Alma and Paula she ends up discovering that the culprit was Álvaro. After a while she forgives Álvaro and they start dating, until she discovers that he was cheating on her with Alma. During the following course he intends to make life impossible for him, in addition to totally changing his attitude, making out every day with a different boy; He eventually shatters Alma's self-esteem and confidence when he steals the money she made through prostitution. She makes very good friends with Román, who will help her put aside so much resentment with Alma. She starts a relationship with Salva. (seasons 5–7)
 Daniela Vaquero Castiñeira (Lorena Mateo) She is Vaquero's sister and arrives mid-year after having been in boarding school, so she can keep her mother company after her father's death. His arrival is a bit bumpy because they mistakenly think that he has AIDS and they make life impossible for him, until everything clears up. When she meets Jon, she hooks up with him, while becoming best friends with Salva, thinking he's gay. When he discovers that Salva is really in love with her and that Jon does not respect him enough, he decides not to want to know anything about either of them, but he ends up deciding on Salva, which coincides with Jon falling down the stairs, and causes to leave the relationship. In the last season Daniela becomes the witch and hateful of the school; she intimidates her friends and fights Yoli for being the class delegate. When he discovers that Enrique wants to sell the school, nobody believes her. (seasons 5–7)
 Violeta Cortés Calvo (Irene Sánchez) She is Irene's niece and she arrives after escaping from a residence because her classmates made her life impossible. Fake a depression to enroll in the Zurbarán. Has a fat complex. She makes life impossible for Irene even though she has welcomed her into her home because she doesn't like her aunt's way of life and wants her to change for the better. Violeta is very fond of the internet, horror movies and video games. She likes Julio very much and they quickly become very close friends, despite the fact that he was initially ashamed of her because of her physique. She is the creator of "Ciber Zurbarán", a virtual school that becomes very popular among all students. Later, her mother discovers that she has sex with Julio and thinks that she is out of control and takes her out of school and takes her away from Madrid to put her in boarding school. (seasons 3–4)
 Joaquín "Quino" Domínguez Palma (Óscar Sinela) He is a Christian Evangelist. He always goes with the guitar and his dream is to be a singer. He is half Venezuelan. His father abandoned him and his mother as soon as they returned to Spain. He arrives at the institute in the middle of the year and falls in love with Yoli. His love for her causes him to give up a role in a Nacho Cano musical. He wants to get married a virgin, which makes his relationship with Yoli not work. His distrust causes Alma to help him overcome the insecurities he has. He loses his virginity to Alma and secretly brings alcohol to the end-of-year party, knowing it was forbidden. When they discover him, he is expelled from the center and goes to try his luck in the world of music. In the end he manages to record a CD. (seasons 3–4)
 Jan Taeming (Andrés Chueng) He is very good at drawing. When he arrives at Zurbarán, Gorka and Cabano make life impossible for him. He likes Paula and is dating her for a while. His parents force him to marry his cousin, so that she can obtain permanent residence in Spain, and he ends up cheating on Paula with her. This causes them to break up and shortly after he goes to China. (seasons 1–2; 7) 
 Álvaro Soler (Álex Batllori) He is a good student, very pressured by his father. He is the one who sets up the party where someone drugs Teresa. It is finally discovered that he was the culprit. He likes Alma, but this discovery makes Alma leave him and everyone turns their back on him. He meets Alma secretly, while Teresa forgives him and begins a relationship with her. When everything is discovered, he is left alone again and dedicates himself, together with Jon, to making life impossible for some classmates, such as Salva or Toño, who is the one who tries to kill him in high school with a shotgun. After this he starts taking anabolics, which will make him end up in a coma. Upon waking up frontera the coma, he tells Alma that he loves her and they are back together. (seasons 5–7)
 Jon (Álex Hernández) He has an accident after jumping into a pool from a balcony that left him in a wheelchair, although out of shame he says it was a motorcycle accident, but at no time does he want people to feel sorry for him. He arrives at the institute and immediately there is a rapprochement between him and Daniela at a party. He befriends Salva, but the friendship will be broken when he discovers that he also likes Daniela. After a fight with him that makes him roll down the stairs and has him in a coma for a whole summer, he becomes his enemy and begins to make life impossible for him with Álvaro. When Toño, another boy he was bullying, appears at the institute with a shotgun ready to kill him, he makes up with all his friends. Jon later reveals that the motorcycle accident was a lie and that his immobility was due to wanting to be cool and having jumped into a pool from the second floor, a madness that ended in tragedy. (seasons 6–7)

Zurbarán School staff 
Olimpia Díaz Centeno (Ana Milán) She is the English teacher. She is very hard on students and has no sympathy with them or with too many teachers for being too inflexible at times. At the beginning of the series she is married to Félix, but the marriage separates when she cheats on him with Roque and becomes pregnant without knowing from whom. She takes Clara out of the school management and she is the director until Martín arrives. When her son, Darío, was born, her relationship with Roque had already ended. She performs paternity tests on Darío, and the baby's father turns out to be Félix. Later she has a short relationship with David's father, not knowing that he was still married. She has a relationship with Martín, with whom she bought a house. After her relationship with Martín. She begins a relationship, not very serious, with Vaquero. She likes Enrique, but the relationship stops when she discovers that he wants to sell the school. (seasons 1–7)
 Clara Yáñes Mediavilla (Nuria González) At the beginning of the series she is the director of Zurbarán. When Ruth's parents die, she takes over as a legal guardian. Later, Olimpia takes her position away and becomes head of studies when Adolfo leaves. He is always very aware of the students and the rest of the teachers, despite the fact that for a season he has a depression that causes him to lower his self-esteem due to a threat from a group of Nazis. She decides to adopt a child, but social services informs her that due to her age, she has no chance of receiving a baby. Later, she welcomes 16-year-old Román into her home. She leaves school to go to Argentina with Ricardo. (seasons 1–7)
 Blanca Román Hernández (Cecilia Freire) She is the Literature teacher and begins to work at the center, at first with many insecurities. She also shows many insecurities with her relationships with men. She likes Jonathan, but overcomes her fears with Mario, Irene's ex-boyfriend. He shares a flat with Irene, and this brings problems, especially when she falls in love with Miguel and sees that he likes Irene. When she teaches Berto, they start a relationship, which she has at the same time as with Martín. Berto and Martín, the two ask her hand in marriage, and after many doubts she decides for Martín. She is going to New York after Martín planted her at the altar on her wedding day. She returned to Spain and changed schools. In the last chapter she appears with Berto. (seasons 1–4; 7)
 Irene Calvo Azpeolea (Blanca Romero) She begins to work in the first episode as a philosophy teacher, she is liberal and cultured. On the first day of class, she discovers that during the summer she had a one-night stand with a student, Isaac. This relationship continues in secret, even Clara and Adolfo discover it, which makes her stop being a teacher for a while. When she returns, her relationship with Isaac is over. For a time she is with Miguel, but a possible return with Isaac and the subsequent death of the student is interposed. Months later she meets Thomas, the American English teacher who has been working for a time at the center, with whom she begins a relationship full of ups and downs. During the summer they get married in Las Vegas. She doesn't take it seriously because she doesn't get used to the idea of always being with the same man. They have a severe crisis, but finally she goes to the United States to finish homologate her marriage. At the end of the series, Irene appears pregnant with Thomas. (seasons 1–4; 7)
 Roque Madrona Castro (Bart Santana) He is the art teacher. He is Adolfo's son and at first they don't have a very good relationship. He has a young daughter, Alba, with his ex-wife Leonora, from whom he separated due to her mental instability. Leo comes between him and Olympia. During a summer vacation, Roque got involved with Alma, who inspired him to paint his pictures. Alma harasses him for a while and when Roque gives in, she gets fed up with the game and ends the relationship. Because of this, Roque starts using drugs to help him work. For a few months he is in rehab. He shows interest in Marina, who does not let the relationship advance for fear of trusting her secret. Roque leaves the Zurbarán to go to London to take care of his daughter. (seasons 1–5)
 Vicente Vaquero Castiñeira (Marc Clotet) He is 30 years old. He is the professor of Physical Education. He's a bit immature. He enters the Zurbarán by management of his father, who owns the school. He insists that Vicente is a playboy, unsuccessful and good for nothing, and he gets him the job to see if his son is looking for life. He becomes too friendly with the students, which the rest of the teachers advise against. His father dies after a fight with him that affected his heart. Vicente, by inheritance, becomes the majority shareholder of the school. At first he likes Irene, but when she leaves he hooks up with Verónica, with whom he will maintain a three-way relationship with Berto, until he leaves. For a time he is with Olimpia. After the summer, he married Sara, an Argentine whom he met at a summer camp, so that she could legally stay in Spain. At the end of the series they deport Sara, and Vicente, goes with her to Argentina. (seasons 4–7)
 Verónica Lebrón Cervantes (Olivia Molina) She arrives at the institute to teach literature classes, but also looking for her daughter, Teresa, whom she abandoned when she was little. She is very liberal, which will bring her problems with Luis, Teresa's father, with her daughter, and with other teachers due to her bad example. For a time she has a relationship with Berto and Vaquero at the same time. When the trio is over, a relationship with Jorge begins full of ups and downs. After the breakup, Xavi moves to her apartment, and although he likes Sara, a relationship emerges between them that is consolidated. (seasons 5–7)
 Arturo Ochando Villalba (Enrique Arce) He is a doctor and goes to work at the center as a professor of Biology after having problems with the law for being accused of having euthanized his wife, who died of cancer. Despite having doubts about whether he was guilty or innocent of having killed his wife. He confesses that he felt unable to do anything to her. He starts a relationship with Marina. (seasons 6–7)
 Xavier "Xavi" López (Juan Pablo Di Pace) He is the art teacher who is installed in Verónica's house. He's rebellious, funny, and a stoner. He leaves his apartment, which he sublets to David and Fer to go live with Verónica. Xavi is in a relationship with Sara. He starts a relationship with Verónica. (season 7)
 Enrique Lubián (Fernando Andina) He arrives as director after Martín's departure. He is a friend of Vaquero's family. He invested in the institute to resell it and tear it down, which was not revealed until the last episode. He is posh, arrogant, fascist, racist and homophobic, he never gets to like the students or the teachers. Enrique's affection is reserved solely for his dog, Frida. He showed interest in Olimpia and was about to start a relationship with her, but Olimpia stops him when she discovers his true intentions. The series ends with Enrique wondering whether or not to sign the sale of the Zurbarán. (season 7)
 Miguel Belaza (Michel Brown) He is Argentinian. He comes to the center as a technology teacher and also to give a theater workshop. He shares a flat with Irene and Blanca, between whom a love triangle will be created. In the past, he lost his wife in an accident that also killed children on a school bus, causing him to receive threats for a time. At the end of the second season he leaves because he cannot decide between Blanca and Irene. (season 2)
 Sara Pires (Sabrina Garciarena) She is Argentinian. She is Vaquero's wife, she marries him to obtain a residence permit in Spain. She starts working as a Philosophy teacher and starts a relationship with Xavi. When the immigration officers discover that her marriage to Vaquero was a fraud, they deport her to Argentina, but before leaving, Vaquero tells her that he loves her and he goes with her to Argentina. (season 7)
 Jorge (Sergio Mur) He comes to the center as a counselor and later is the art teacher when Roque leaves. He is bisexual. At first there is a rapprochement between him and David, but he decides to distance himself when he knows that he is staying as a teacher. He goes to live at Verónica's house and ends up falling in love with her, but after the holidays he leaves her for another, and that makes him leave both the apartment and the institute. (seasons 5–6)
 Adolfo Madrona Bermúdez (Joaquín Climent) He is the head of studies. He has a very good relationship with the teachers, but not so good with his son. On a couple of occasions it denotes his attraction to Irene. His marriage breaks down when he falls in love with Loli, the mother of Paula and Isaac. This relationship falls apart after Isaac's death. Adolfo tries to get back to his wife, but she falls in love with another man. He has problems with the shareholders because of an article he publishes, and, due to this fact, his position at the school begins to be in danger. Despite being offered the post of director of Zurbarán, he takes early retirement and, thanks to Martín, he begins to write a book. (seasons 1–4; 7)
 Félix Alonso Arenes (Xavi Mira) He is the music teacher and the husband of Olimpia. He divorces Olimpia when he discovers that she has cheated on him with Roque and the child he is expecting may not be his. He ends up leaving high school because it is very difficult for him to see her every day. When Darío is born, he turns out to be his son, and he is willing to play the role of father. (seasons 1–3; 5; 7)
 Alberto "Berto" Freire Carballar (Álex Barahona) He is Yoli's brother and has been in jail. He works in the school as a waiter in the cafeteria, he will also be the football coach and maintenance man. As they ask him to graduate for work, he asks Blanca to help him with his studies. This makes them fall in love, but since Blanca decides to marry Martín, the relationship ends, even though he still likes her. When Blanca leaves, Berto starts dating Verónica. For a while she has a threesome with her and Vaquero, until she sees that this relationship is going nowhere and leaves. In the last chapter he appears with Blanca. (seasons 2–7)
 Martín Aguilar Novallas (José Manuel Seda) He is a professor of technology and a psychopedagogue. He joins the center as a member of the shareholders' meeting and soon becomes the director. He maintains a relationship with Blanca and they are about to get married, but at the altar he says no because he realizes that he likes Olimpia. Once with Olimpia, he discovers that he has impregnated a stripper with whom he had a sporadic relationship. This makes his relationship with Olimpia go cold. When they are ending the relationship, he receives the news that the girl, Maria, has been born and the mother has abandoned her. He decides to take care of her. He leaves the institute after resigning for having stolen the 6000 euros of the prize that Zurbarán received for winning the musical contest. (seasons 3–7)
 Jonathan Zafra (Michel Gurfi) He is the Physical Education teacher. He has a brief relationship with Blanca. He goes to Mexico for family reasons. (season 1)
 Marina Conde (Cristina Alcázar) She arrives at the institute to replace Irene as a Philosophy teacher. She has very conservative ideas, and is very reserved when it comes to interacting with men, especially with Roque. She is hiding a secret, her ex-boyfriend gave her HIV. She finally confesses it in front of everyone because they thought that Daniela had AIDS and they made her life impossible. She abandons teaching to occupy the position of councilor in her parents' town. She begins a relationship with Arturo. (seasons 5–7)

Recurring characters 
 Mario Barrio (Fele Martínez) Irene's old boyfriend. He stays for a few days at the institute to do a report. He has sex with Blanca out of spite before leaving. (seasons 1–2)
 Marisa Castro (María Casal) She is Roque's mother and Adolfo's wife. She is an inspector of schools and institutes. She has a strong character, which makes her husband and son hide their personal problems from her. She divorces Adolfo after the cancer operation. She rebuilds her life with another man. (seasons 2–4)
 Leonor "Leo" Grandes Álvarez (Verónika Moral) She is the ex-wife of Roque and the mother of Alba, their daughter. She lived for five years in Belgium and returns to Zurbarán as a professor of philosophy. She is insecure, crazy and unhinged. She tricks Roque into sleeping with her, causing him to become distracted and not be aware of the class during the quad accident where Isaac lost his life. Leo leaves for the United States where she fails, returns to Spain and then moves to London. (seasons 2–3)
 Pablo Calleja (Pablo Espinosa) He is a friend of Julio and Cabano. At the end of the fourth season, Julio suspects that it was he who sneaked alcohol into the end-of-year party, but Pablo confesses that he was not and reports that the culprit was Quino. (seasons 3–4)
 Lucía Prieto (Miriam Giovanelli) She is Rodrigo's sister. She is a very manipulative person. She was Julio's girlfriend for a season and managed to turn him against all his friends. She was arrested along with her brother Rodrigo. (seasons 2–3)
 Luis Parra (Isak Férriz) He is Teresa's father and Verónica's ex-boyfriend. Verónica left them when they were both 16 years old. Luis raised Teresa alone, and is enraged when he finds out that Verónica is looking for her. He reproaches her lifestyle and does everything possible to keep Teresa away from her "slutty" mother. Teresa is taken to Seville, and she escapes and returns to Madrid alone. Finally, Luis agrees that Teresa spend a season with Verónica before reaching the age of majority. (seasons 5–6)
 Erica (Aura Garrido) She is Alma's best friend from childhood. Erica is mentally unbalanced. Alma and Erica inadvertently caused the drowning death of another girl who wanted to join them. Alma had to change her life to escape the experience. Erica, manages to find Alma and turn her friends against her. He plays mind games with the Zurbarán boys and tries to assassinate Alma and Paula by setting the school on fire. In the end she was arrested for terrorism. (season 3)
 Andrés (Diego Domínguez) He is a troubled boy, who has serious problems with Álvaro and frequently abuses Salva.  (season 6)
 Frida (Cook) It's Enrique's dog. It is extremely spoiled. She does not like Olimpia, who accidentally runs over her, and the dog bites Olimpia. (season 7)
 Rubén de la Torre Reig (Julio Soler Vargas) He is Julio's younger brother. Rubén admired his older brother because he saw him as everything he was not, popular, athletic, sure of himself. He was Cova's boyfriend. He abandons his best friend Adrián González to his fate in a park after a drug overdose, he spent several months visiting him. When Adrián dies, Rubén's guilt is so great that he ends up committing suicide. Julio decides to seek the truth behind the events and suffers when he learns that his brother was about to rape a girl, but did not reach adulthood due to his friend's overdose. (season 1)
 Alonso de la Torre (Jaime Pujol) He is the father of Julio and Rubén and the father-in-law of Cova. He abandoned his two children and his wife 10 years ago. (seasons 4–5)
 Mr. César Cabano (Santiago Meléndez) He is Cabano's father. He is abusive and intimidating, he beats his son and his wife. He assaults Blanca. His wife divorces him and takes their son. Later he cuts off all financial support for both, causing Cabano to have to make a living doing illegal work for minors. (seasons 1–2)
 Lourdes de Vera (Andrea Guardiola) She is the mother of Cabano. (season 2; season 4)
 Dolores "Loli" Prieto Marcos (Teresa Arbolí) She is the mother of Paula and Isaac. She divorces her husband and starts dating Adolfo. Her relationship with Adolfo fails after Isaac's death. She does not support Paula in her desire to become a singer, and she is responsible for Gorka's disappearance and estrangement.(seasons 1–6)
 Oliver Navarro (Oliver Morellón) He is a classmate of the boys and friend of Gorka. He pretended to be gay to play a joke on Fer. Oliver is in the men's bathroom with Cova to help her find out what kind of drugs Fer used at the party he was with Hugo, even though Oliver thinks that Cova called him to have sex with him. He was the culprit of raping Yoli. He receives a beating from Berto who left him in the hospital. The conscience is so great that Oliver turns himself in to the police. Yoli makes him believe that she forgives him, but then tells him that she never would. (seasons 1–2)
 Rodrigo Prieto (Carlos Velasco Peinado) He is Lucía's brother. He is Julio's coach at the gym. He befriends him, and turns him against all his friends. Rodrigo is the head of a gang of neo-Nazis and recruits Julio to adopt his way of thinking. The group sows terror in the city, hitting immigrants, homosexuals and people of other religions, including Quino. When he discovers that Julio is betraying him, he gives him a beating that leaves him in the hospital. Julio ambushes Rodrigo, causing him to be arrested. (seasons 2–3)
 Yolanda "Peque" Sánchez (Denise Maestre) She is a gypsy student who studies at Zurbarán without the permission of her parents, only with the consent of her brother. Although Olimpia does everything possible for her to continue studying, in the end she has to leave it at the will of her parents, who despite their very 
 Antonio Blasco (Mario Vedoya) He is the father of Paula and Isaac. (season 2)
 Alba Madrona Grandes (Carmen Sánchez Lozano/Lucía Caraballo Fabelo) She is the daughter of Roque and Leo. She is in the custody of her mother who takes her around the world, manipulates her and treats her badly. Roque even tried to obtain her legal custody. Alba was about to consume her father's drugs, Clara realized it and saved her life. She has problems with her health that make Roque travel to be with her, in London. (seasons 2–4)
 Matilde Mora Mejía (Arantxa Aranguren) She is Gorka's mother, she overprotective of her son. Gorka is ashamed of her when she is present. To control Gorka, Zurbarán decides to hire Matilde as a cleaning lady and she accepts. (seasons 1–4)
 Thomas McDonald (Mark Schardan) He's American. He is shy, clumsy and reserved. He's the English teacher, he was hired by Martín to teach English to the teachers. He falls in love with Irene, but since she can't make up her mind, he takes a job as a stewardess for British Airways. He breaks up with Irene over the internet, later they return, and Thomas takes Irene to the United States for three months, where they get married. Irene proposes to him to have an open relationship, which she does not like. Then Thomas falls in love with another woman, but this relationship fails. In the end he returns with Irene and they return to the United States. In the last season it is discovered that Thomas and Irene will have a baby. (seasons 3–4)
 Dr. Javier Ferrán (Ángel Hidalgo) He is the father of David and the doctor of Darío, the son of Olimpia and Félix. Like his wife, he is extremely homophobic, he has a homosexual brother who he never talks about. (seasons 3–4)
 Dr. Eva Quintanilla (Amaia Lizarralde) She is mother of David. She is a doctor and used to travel to many conferences. Her absences were used by her husband to deceive her. She was very shocked at the coming out of the closet of her son, David. (seasons 4–6)
 Carmen Ruano (Paloma Gómez Núñez) She is the mother of Fer.  (season 1; seasons 5–7)
 Mr. Taeming (Carlos Wu) Jan's Chinese father who owns a convenience store in town. (seasons 1–2)
 Hugo (Adrián Marín) He is a student of Zurbarán. He was Fer's first boyfriend and with whom Fer lost his virginity. Fer and him break up when Fer discovers that he has recorded a video of them while they were having sex and Fer calls him a pervert. (season 2)
 Marga (Susana Martins) She is the president of the Parents Association. She is quite nosy and arrogant, although she always wants the well-being of the Zurbarán students. (season 2)
 Xiaomei (Nancy Yao) She is Jan's cousin and wife. She comes to Spain to marry him and thus obtain residency. Jan leaves Paula believing that her cousin is crazy about him, but then she reveals that she slept with him to get pregnant because if she gave birth in Spain, she would automatically obtain residency. The marriage fails, however, both she and Jan returned to China. (season 2)
 Marta (Ximena Suárez) She is the Physical Education Teacher. Martín fires her when he hires Vaquero, the son of the school's main shareholder. (seasons 2–4)
 Andrea (Aída de la Cruz) She is a friend of Cabano, she is ill with cancer and she is going to be in charge of helping Cabano to be more optimistic when facing the disease. She dies of cancer. (season 4)
 Borja (Israel Rodríguez) Artist and sculptor. He is Fer's boyfriend during the sixth season. He hates David and doesn't like the attention Fer gives David. He proposes to Fer who accepts. During the wedding David shows up to stop the wedding and get Fer back. Although Fer doubts and tries to move on, Borja is the one who decides not to marry knowing that Fer cares for him but not the strong love he feels for David. (season 6)
 Adrián González He was Rubén's best friend, Julio's younger brother. He passes away after a drug overdose that left him in a coma for several months. (season 1)
 Laura She is a classmate of the boys at Zurbarán. She goes out with Gorka for a while, which makes Ruth jealous. She is particularly affected by Adolfo's disease. (seasons 1–3)
 Ana She is a girl who is a student at Zurbarán. She gets along very well with Yoli but not with Alma. (seasons 3–6)

Guest stars and cameos 
 Adriana Torrebejano as Cristina.
 Marina Gatell as Sandra.
 Amparo Valle as Clara's mother.
 Nacho Cano as himself.
 El Sueño de Morfeo as themselves.
 Liz Solari and Tomás de las Heras as Carlota "Charlotte" Carresi and Gonzalo Torres respectively, from the show Champs 12.
 Ana Fernández García and Lucho Fernandez as Sandra Benedetti and Culebra respectively, in a crossover with the television series Los protegidos.
 Carmen Gutiérrez as Cristina Calvo Azpeolea, Violeta's mother and Irene's sister.
 Farah Hamed as Fátima Arco, Román's mother.
 Marina Andina as Cova's mother and Julio's mother-in-law.
 Luisa Ezquerra as Mother of Julio and Rubén and the mother-in-law of Cova.
 Isidoro Fernández as Ricardo Gómez, Father of Ruth.
 Despistaos as themselves.
 DJ Nano as himself.

Deceased characters

Scenarios

Zurbarán High School 
HS is where most of the drama takes part. The rooms, the cafeteria, the library, the hallways, the elevator, the teachers' room, the bathrooms... The building becomes the scenario for most of the interactions among students and teachers.

Teachers' house 

The home of Irene (Blanca Romero) and Blanca (Cecilia Freire) is a flat always occupied by other teachers such as Miguel, (Michel Brown), Violeta (Irene Sánchez), or Irene's nephew. After this last one left, the free room was taken by Vaquero (Marc Clotet), who stays in the flat after Irene and Blanca finally leave.

Later on, Vaquero rents the free rooms Verónica (Olivia Molina) and Jorge (Sergio Mur). Because of the constant flirting going on between these two, Vaquero decides to leave the flat, to the couple, but after they break up, Jorge leaves too.

Currently the flat is shared by Verónica (Olivia Molina), Sara (Sabrina Garciarena) and Xavi (Juan Pablo Di Pace).

Other scenarios
The students' houses, restaurants and even the street are also scenarios used in this TV show.

Episodes

Season 1 (2008)

Season 2 (2008)

Season 3 (2009)

Season 4 (2009)

Season 5 (2010)

Season 6 (2010)

Season 7 (2011)

Broadcasters

Reunion 
A two-episode reunion miniseries, Física o Química: El reencuentro, starring Andrea Duro, Maxi Iglesias, Gonzalo Ramos, Angy Fernández, Adam Jezierski, Javier Calvo, Adrián Rodríguez, Sandra Blázquez, Ana Milán, Marc Clotet, Leonor Martín, Andrés Cheung, Álex Barahona, Blanca Romero and José Lamuño, premiered on 27 December 2020 on streaming platform Atresplayer Premium.

References

External links 
 
 

2008 Spanish television series debuts
2011 Spanish television series endings
Television shows set in Madrid
Spanish-language education television programming
Antena 3 (Spanish TV channel) network series
Gay-related television shows
2000s Spanish drama television series
2010s Spanish drama television series
2000s teen drama television series
2010s teen drama television series
Spanish teen drama television series
Television series about teenagers